Berosus aculeatus is a species of hydrophilid beetle native to the United States and Cuba. It was originally described by John Lawrence LeConte in 1855 and is characterized by prolonged apices of its elytra.

References

Hydrophilinae
Beetles described in 1855